Jacinto, founded in 1836, was named for the Battle of San Jacinto in the Texas Revolution. Jacinto was located in the geographic center of the original Tishomingo County, Mississippi. Within ten years of its founding, Jacinto became a flourishing town with stores, hotels, schools, churches, and taverns, serving as the center of government and commerce for the county.

Jacinto is the site of a courthouse built in 1854 in the Federal style as the county courthouse for the original Tishomingo County. The courthouse has been refurbished and is listed in the National Register of Historic Places.  It is open to visitors.

A skirmish occurred on September 7, 1863 in the vicinity of Jacinto between Confederate and Union Cavalry during the American Civil War.

In 1869, Tishomingo was divided into three counties: Tishomingo, Alcorn, and Prentiss. Corinth became the county seat of newly established Alcorn County, Iuka of the reduced Tishomingo County, and Booneville of the new county of Prentiss.  When the county seat was moved from Jacinto in 1870, the town's importance declined, and town residents and businesses began moving away.

A post office operated under the name Jacinto from 1840 to 1909. 

Jacinto appears on the Glens U.S. Geological Survey Map.

It was first named as a CDP in the 2020 Census which listed a population of 52.

Demographics

2020 census

Note: the US Census treats Hispanic/Latino as an ethnic category. This table excludes Latinos from the racial categories and assigns them to a separate category. Hispanics/Latinos can be of any race.

Gallery

References

Unincorporated communities in Alcorn County, Mississippi
Populated places established in 1836
1836 establishments in Mississippi
Unincorporated communities in Mississippi
Census-designated places in Alcorn County, Mississippi